At the Seaside is a late 19th-century painting by American artist William Merritt Chase. Done in oil on canvas, the painting depicts a seaside scene set in Long Island, New York. The work is in the collection of the Metropolitan Museum of Art, in New York.

References

1892 paintings
Paintings by William Merritt Chase
Paintings in the collection of the Metropolitan Museum of Art